Kalachinsky (masculine), Kalachinskaya (feminine), or Kalachinskoye (neuter) may refer to:
Kalachinsky District, a district of Omsk Oblast, Russia
Kalachinskaya, a rural locality (a village) in Omsk Oblast, Russia